Yelena Valentinovna Sayko (born December 24, 1967) is a retired female race walker from Russia, who competed for the Unified Team at the 1992 Summer Olympics in Barcelona, Spain. She set her personal best (41.56) in the women's 10 km event in 1996.

Achievements

References

External links

Profile

1971 births
Living people
Russian female racewalkers
Athletes (track and field) at the 1992 Summer Olympics
Olympic athletes of the Unified Team
Goodwill Games medalists in athletics
Competitors at the 1994 Goodwill Games